DAPD News Agency (in German dapd Nachrichtenagentur) was a German news agency.

Overview
It was founded in September 2010 with its headquarters in Berlin. It was the second largest German news agency. It originated from the former West-German news agency Deutscher Depeschendienst (ddp), which had been "built out of remnants of the old UPI news service and the former East-German state-sponsored news service" ADN after reunification. In 2009, under private equity ownership, DDP acquired the German branch of the American news agency Associated Press (AP), and the combined agency was renamed DAPD in 2010.

The owners were Martin Vorderwülbecke and Peter Löw, Managing Directors. Chief Editor was Cord Dreyer. The fully international news agency covered both regional and international issues.

The news service had a base of 700 customers, and provided up to 500 messages and 2,000 photographs daily. Among the customers were German newspapers and magazines, online media, television and radio transmitters, parties and governments, businesses, institutions and associations. In August 2011, the agency also created a sports service.

In July 2011, DAPD bought French photo agency Sipa Press.

In January 2012 it was announced that DAPD would open a news service in France.

In October 2012, the DAPD filed for insolvency protection, with all six of its subsidiaries declaring bankruptcy.

References

External links 
 Official website DAPD Nachrichtenagentur (de)

News agencies based in Germany
Mass media in Berlin